Kim Jin-ya (born 30 June 1998) is a South Korean footballer who plays for FC Seoul. Mainly a defensive midfielder, he can also play as a left-back.

Club career

Incheon United 
After graduating from Daegun High School, Kim began his professional career with Incheon United FC.

FC Seoul 
On 13 December, he has officially moved to FC Seoul in K League 1.

International career 
He was part of the South Korea U-23 squad that won gold at the 2018 Asian Games.

Career statistics

Club

Honours

International 
South Korea U-23
Asian Games: 2018
AFC U-23 Championship: 2020

References

External links 
 

1998 births
Living people
Association football midfielders
South Korean footballers
Incheon United FC players
FC Seoul players
K League 1 players
Footballers at the 2018 Asian Games
Asian Games medalists in football
Asian Games gold medalists for South Korea
Medalists at the 2018 Asian Games
South Korea under-17 international footballers
South Korea under-20 international footballers
South Korea under-23 international footballers
Sportspeople from Incheon
Footballers at the 2020 Summer Olympics
Olympic footballers of South Korea